The Colonne di San Basilio (Columns of St Basil) are an ancient Greek structure, which take their name from the mountain of San Basilio where they are located, in the territory of Lentini.

Site 
The summit of the mountain shows trances of ancient settlement from the prehistoric period, with clear traces of the postholes of a hut, probably belonging to the Casteluccio culture.

A little way away is the imposing structure itself, carved in the limestone rock and measuring 18 x 16 metres, with 32 columns designed to support rock slabs. Part of the structure has collapsed, but many of the columns remain standing.

The scale of the monument drew the attention of the traveller Jean-Pierre Houël who drew some sketches of it in 1777, along with some interesting written testimony:

But it was the archaeologist Paolo Orsi who first investigated its possible functions. He theorised that it was a cistern used to supply water to soldiers present in the fortified area. The remains of fortifications of the Greek period are actually visible around the mountain, which allow one to imagine a purely military use of the site, which dominates the Plain of Catana and the city of Lentini.

The structure was later reused by the Byzantines, who converted it into a church. Some traces of religious frescoes are even visible on some of the columns, but they are not legible.

Throughout the area, various hypogeic structures of unclear purpose are visible, as well as a small temple of Demeter and Kore.

Other theories 
After Paolo Orsi, the site was not subject to further archaeological excavation and as a result information on it is scarce. However, a different hypothetical function has been suggested for the structure - as a granary rather than a reservoir.
The site later became associated with the ancient Brikinnai mentioned by Thucydides in the History of the Peloponnesian War:

However the absence of any decisive elements and of archaeological evidence prevents any certainty.

State of the site 
Currently the area is completely abandoned. There is no form of protection or plans to install security. Inside, the site is increasingly thick with vegetation which prevents inspection and some of the remains are in danger of collapse. There are traces of illegal excavation all across the mountain.

Gallery

References

Bibliography

External links 
The Colonne di San Basilio (Italian)

Archaeological sites in Sicily
Buildings and structures in the Province of Syracuse